A material ropeway, ropeway conveyor (or aerial tramway in the US) is a subtype of gondola lift, from which containers for goods rather than passenger cars are suspended.

Description
Material ropeways are typically found around large mining concerns, and can be of considerable length.

Conveyors can be powered by a wide variety of forms of energy, such as electricity, engines, or gravity (particularly in mountainous mining concerns, or where running water is available). Gravity-driven conveyors may qualify as zip-lines, as no electricity is used to operate them, instead relying on the weight of carts going down providing propulsion for empty carts going up.

Double-rope (bi-cable) ropeways, have a carrying rope that supports the buckets and a separate hauling rope that controls their movement. Single-rope (mono-cable) ropeways use one carrying-hauling rope.

History
The first recorded mechanical ropeway was by Croatian Fausto Veranzio who designed a bicable passenger ropeway in 1616.
The world's first cable car on multiple supports was built by Adam Wybe in Gdańsk, Poland in 1644. It was powered by horses and used to move soil over the river to build defences.

It was made for Bharat Aluminium Company (Balco) in collaboration with Nikex, Hungary.

In the United Kingdom, aerial ropeways used for conveying mining goods and materials were historically common; however, just one remains in existence and operation, in Claughton, Lancashire, constructed in 1924 and used for quarrying shale to make bricks. It is scheduled to be demolished in 2036, once the last of the shale has been quarried.

List

Closed ropeways

See also 
 Ropeway
 Zip-line

References

External links 
 La Teleferica Massaua-Asmara (pictures of Ethiopian ropeway) www.trainweb.org
 Conveyor & Ropeways Services Pvt. Ltd. www.crspl.com
 Low-tech Magazine: "Aerial ropeways: automatic cargo transport for a bargain"
Financial Express: "Tracing the course of infra technology Indian ropeways have been using since the 1970s"
 An Unedited, Rain-Soaked Ride on Claughton's Aerial Ropeway
Trenton-Bleichert System of Aerial Tramways
The Bleichert System of Wire Rope Tramways
Wire Rope Transportation in All Its Branches
Aerial Rope Transport by J. W. Mackie (1916)

Aerial tramways
Gondola lifts